Rex Smith   (born Henry W. Schmidt) (1864–1895), is a former professional baseball player who played pitcher in the Major Leagues for the 1886 Philadelphia Athletics and Cincinnati Red Stockings of the American Association.

That first appearance was the result of Cincinnati ace Tony Mullane refusing to pitch the game, according to the next day's Cincinnati Commercial Tribune, which does not give Mullane's reason for refusing to play. In that snippet, he is only identified as Smith and is said to be from Jersey City, New Jersey. The Brooklyn Eagle from the same date – Cincinnati was facing the Brooklyn Grays – says that Mr. Smith was from Louisville, Kentucky. The reconciliation between these two apparently contradictory facts can be found in the May 19 issue of Sporting Life, which says Jersey City has a new pitcher called Rex Smith who hails from Louisville. That makes him the same man who pitched a game for Philadelphia later in the season.

References

External links

1861 births
1895 deaths
Major League Baseball pitchers
Baseball players from Louisville, Kentucky
19th-century baseball players
Philadelphia Athletics (AA) players
Cincinnati Red Stockings (AA) players
Milwaukee Cream Citys players